Associazione Polisportiva Dilettantistica Ribelle 1927, commonly referred to as Ribelle, is an Italian football club based in Castiglione di Ravenna, a fraction of Ravenna, Emilia-Romagna. Currently it plays in Italy's Serie D/D.

History

Foundation
The club was founded in 1927.

Serie D
In the season 2013–14 the team was promoted for the first time, from Eccellenza Emilia-Romagna/B to Serie D/D.

Colours and badge
The team's colours are white and blue.

Players

First team

Youth

Honours
Eccellenza Emilia-Romagna/B: 2013–14

References

External links
 Official website 

Football clubs in Italy
Football clubs in Emilia-Romagna
Association football clubs established in 1927
1927 establishments in Italy